Jiujiang Bridge may refer to:

Bridges in China:
 Jiujiang Yangtze River Bridge, over the Yangtze River in Jiujiang City, Jiangx
 Jiujiang Fuyin Expressway Bridge currently under construction in Jiujiang City, Jiangxi
 The Jiujiang Bridge in Guangdong, which collapsed in 2007.